Ptericoptus acuminatus is a species of beetle in the family Cerambycidae. It was described by Johan Christian Fabricius in 1801. It is known from Argentina, Brazil and Paraguay.

References

Ptericoptus
Beetles described in 1801